The Olympic Committee of Equatorial Guinea (IOC code: GEQ) is the National Olympic Committee representing Equatorial Guinea.

See also
 Equatorial Guinea at the Olympics

References

Equatorial Guinea
Equatorial Guinea at the Olympics